Science and technology in Italy has a long presence, from the Roman era and the Renaissance. Through the centuries, Italy has advanced the scientific community which produced many significant inventions and discoveries in biology, physics, chemistry, mathematics, astronomy and the other sciences. In 2019 Italy was the 6th world producer of scientific articles publishing more than 155,000 documents. From 1996 to 2000 it published a total of 2 million scientific articles. Italy was ranked 29th in the Global Innovation Index in 2021.

History

Roman engineering
As early as the 1st century AD, Rome had become one of the biggest and most advanced cities in the world. The ancient Romans invented new technologies to improve the city's sanitation systems, roads, and buildings. They developed a system of aqueducts that piped freshwater into the city, and they built sewers that removed the city's waste. The wealthiest Romans lived in large houses with gardens. Most of the population, however, lived in apartment buildings made of stone, concrete, or limestone. The Romans developed new techniques and used materials such as volcanic soil from Pozzuoli, a village near Naples, to make their cement harder and stronger. This concrete allowed them to build large apartment buildings called insulae.

Renaissance science
Italy had a scientific "golden age" during the Renaissance. Leonardo da Vinci, was trained to be a painter, but his interests and achievements spread into an astonishing variety of fields that are now considered scientific specialties. He conceived ideas vastly ahead of his time. Notably, he invented concepts for the helicopter, an armed fighting vehicle, the use of concentrated solar power, the calculator, a rudimentary theory of plate tectonics, the double hull, and many others, using inspiration from Chinese ideas. In addition, he greatly advanced the fields of knowledge in anatomy, astronomy, civil engineering, optics, and hydrodynamics.

The scientist Galileo Galilei is called the first modern scientist. His work constitutes a significant break from that of Aristotle and medieval philosophers and scientists (who were then referred to as "natural philosophers"). Galileo's achievements include improvements to the telescope, various astronomical observations, and initial formulation of the first and second laws of motion. Galileo was suppressed by the Catholic Church, but was a founder of modern science.

Early modern era
The astronomer Giovanni Domenico Cassini, who made many important discoveries about the Solar System; the physicist Alessandro Volta, who invented the electric battery, thus providing for the first time a sustained source of current electricity; the mathematicians Giuseppe Peano, Lagrange, Fibonacci, and Gerolamo Cardano, whose Ars Magna is generally recognized as the first modern treatment on mathematics, made fundamental advances to the field; Marcello Malpighi, a doctor and founder of microscopic anatomy, his student Antonio Maria Valsalva, who became famous for his research focused on the anatomy of the ears, and finally Valvasia pupil Giovanni Battista Morgagni, the  anatomist generally regarded as the father of modern anatomical pathology; the biologist Lazzaro Spallanzani, who conducted important research in bodily functions, animal reproduction, and cellular theory; the physician, pathologist, scientist, and Nobel laureate Camillo Golgi, whose many achievements include the discovery of the Golgi apparatus, and his role in paving the way to the acceptance of the Neuron doctrine; Giulio Natta, Nobel prize for the  polymerization of plastics. The first internal combustion engine was invented by Eugenio Barsanti and Felice Matteucci, the Barsanti-Matteucci engine, in 1852. It was fueled by a mix of air and hydrogen. The first gasoline internal combustion engine motor vehicle was invented by Enrico Bernardi in 1884. The first pc (personal computer), the Olivetti P6040 and the P6060 was invented by Olivetti engineer Pier Giorgio Perotto in 1975.

Accademia dei Lincei

The Accademia dei Lincei (literally the "Academy of the Lynx-Eyed", but anglicised as the Lincean Academy) is one of the oldest and most prestigious European scientific institutions, located at the Palazzo Corsini on the Via della Lungara in Rome, Italy.

Founded in the Papal States in 1603 by Federico Cesi, the academy was named after the lynx, an animal whose sharp vision symbolizes the observational prowess that science requires. Galileo Galilei was the intellectual centre of the academy and adopted "Galileo Galilei Linceo" as his signature. "The Lincei did not long survive the death in 1630 of Cesi, its founder and patron", and "disappeared in 1651".

During the nineteenth century, it was revived, first in the Vatican and later in the nation of Italy. Thus the Pontifical Academy of Science, founded in 1847, claims this heritage as the Accademia Pontificia dei Nuovi Lincei ("Pontifical Academy of the New Lynxes"), descending from the first two incarnations of the Academy. Similarly, a lynx-eyed academy of the 1870s became the national academy of Italy, encompassing both literature and science among its concerns.

Main universities

Research

The National Research Council (CNR) is the main Italian public research body. Supervised by the Ministry of University and Research, has the task of carrying out, promoting, disseminating, transferring and enhancing scientific and technological research activities in the main sectors of knowledge development and their applications, promoting scientific progress, technological, economic and social. According to the scientific journal Nature, in 2018 the CNR ranked 10th among the most innovative public research bodies in the world for the number of scientific articles published in about 80 journals monitored by the same journal.

Laboratori Nazionali del Gran Sasso (LNGS) is the largest underground research center in the world. Situated below Gran Sasso mountain in Italy, it is well known for particle physics research by the INFN. In addition to a surface portion of the laboratory, there are extensive underground facilities beneath the mountain. The nearest towns are L'Aquila and Teramo. The facility is located about 120 km from Rome. The primary mission of the laboratory is to host experiments that require a low background environment in the fields of astroparticle physics and nuclear astrophysics and other disciplines that can profit of its characteristics and of its infrastructures. The LNGS is, like the three other European underground astroparticle laboratories (Laboratoire Souterrain de Modane, Laboratorio subterráneo de Canfranc, and Boulby Underground Laboratory), a member of the coordinating group ILIAS.

ELETTRA, Eurac Research, ESA Centre for Earth Observation, Institute for Scientific Interchange, International Centre for Genetic Engineering and Biotechnology, Centre for Maritime Research and Experimentation and the International Centre for Theoretical Physics conduct basic research. Trieste has the highest percentage of researchers in Europe in relation to the population. Italy was ranked 29th in the Global Innovation Index in 2021, up from 30th in 2019. The country and especially the Italian Institute of Technology have produced some ingenious humanoid robots like iCub.

CINECA

Italian Space Agency

The Italian Space Agency (ASI) is a government agency established in 1988 to fund, regulate and coordinate space exploration activities in Italy. The agency cooperates with numerous national and international entities who are active in aerospace research and technology.

Nationally, ASI is responsible for both drafting the National Aerospace Plan and ensuring it is carried out. To do this the agency operates as the owner/coordinator of a number of Italian space research agencies and assets such as CIRA as well as organising the calls and opportunities process for Italian industrial contractors on spaceflight projects. Internationally, the ASI provides Italy's delegation to the Council of the European Space Agency and to its subordinate bodies as well as representing the country's interests in foreign collaborations.

ASI's main headquarters are located in Rome, Italy, and the agency also has direct control over two operational centres: the Centre for Space Geodesy (CGS) located in Matera in Italy, and its own spaceport, the Broglio Space Centre (formerly the ) on the coastal sublittoral of Kenya, currently used only as a communications ground station. One further balloon launch base located in Trapani was permanently closed in 2010. In 2020, ASI's annual revenues budget was approximately €2.0 billion and it directly employed around 200 workers.

The three Space Shuttle Multi-Purpose Logistics Module cargo containers Leonardo, Raffaello and Donatello, were manufactured at the Cannes Mandelieu Space Center in Turin, Italy by Alcatel Alenia Space, now Thales Alenia Space. They provide a key function in storing equipment and parts for transfer to the International Space Station. A number of ISS modules have also been made in Italy. As part of ESA's contribution to the costs of the International Space Station, Alcatel Alenia Space manufactured Tranquility, Harmony as well as the Cupola observation deck for NASA. ESA's Columbus module, Western Europe's primary scientific lab on board the ISS, was again built in Turin based on Italy's previous experience in space station module construction.

On 15 December 1964, the first Italian satellite was launched, the San Marco 1, while on 31 July 1992, Franco Malerba, following the STS-46 space mission, was the first Italian to go into space. On 23 November 2014 Samantha Cristoforetti, following the Expedition 42 mission, was the first Italian woman to go into space.

Science museums

There are numerous science museums such as the Museo Nazionale Scienza e Tecnologia Leonardo da Vinci in Milan, the Natural History Museum in Milan, the Città della Scienza in Naples, the Institute and Museum of the History of Science in Florence, the Planetario di Milano in Milan, the Museo di Storia Naturale di Firenze in Florence and the La Specola in Florence.

Other Italian science museums are the Museo Civico di Zoologia in Rome, the Civico Museo di Storia Naturale di Trieste, the Faraggiana Ferrandi Natural History Museum in Novara, the Federico Eusebio Civic Museum of Archaeology and Natural Sciences in Alba, the Museo Civico di Storia Naturale Giacomo Doria in Genoa and the Museo del fiore in Acquapendente. 

Other museums are the Museo Civico Scienze Naturali Enrico Caffi in Bergamo, the Museo di storia naturale della Maremma in Grosseto, the Museo di Storia Naturale di Venezia in Venice, the Natural History Museum of the University of Pisa in Pisa, the Museum Gherdëina in Ortisei, the Natural History Museum in Pavia, the Turin Museum of Natural History and the Zoological Museum of Naples.

Technology parks

There are numerous technology parks in Italy such as the Science and Technology Parks Kilometro Rosso (Bergamo), the AREA Science Park (Trieste), The VEGA-Venice Gateway for Science and Technology (Venice), the Toscana Life Sciences (Siena), the Technology Park of Lodi Cluster (Lodi), Bioindustry Park Silvano Fumero (Canavese) and the Technology Park of Navacchio (Pisa).

Other technology parks in the Northern Italy are the "NOI Techpark Südtirol-Alto Adige" technology park (Bolzano), the "Techno Innovation Park South Tyrol" (Bolzano), the "Trentino Sviluppo" technology park (Rovereto), the "ComoNExT - Innovation Hub" science and technology park (Lomazzo), the "Servitec" science and technology park (Dalmine), the Technological pole (Pavia), the Cremona Technological Pole (Cremona), the CSMT Innovative Contamination Hub (Brescia), the "Bioindustry Park Silvano Fumero" science and technology park (Colleretto Giacosa), the "Tecnogranda" science and technology park (Dronero), the Novara Development Foundation (Novara), the "Environment Park" technology park (Turin), the Science and technology park in the Scrivia Valley (Tortona), the "Galileo" Science and Technology Park (Padua), the "Star" science park (Verona), the Technological center (Pordenone), the "Luigi Danieli" Science and Technology Park (Udine), the "Great Campus" science and technology park (Genoa) and the Torricelli Park of Arts and Science Faventia (Ravenna).

Other technology parks in the Central and the Southern Italy are the Magona Technological Pole Consortium (Cecina), the Technological and archaeological park of the Grosseto Metalliferous Hills in the province of Grosseto, the Lucca technology center (Lucca), the Technological Pole (Navacchio), the "3A-PTA" technology park (Todi), the "Hub21" scientific, technological and cultural center (Ascoli Piceno), the "Pa.L.Mer" technology park (Latina), the Roman scientific pole (Rome), the "Tecnopolo" technological hub (Rome), the Idis-City of Science Foundation (Naples), the TechNapoli" technology park (Pozzuoli), the Science and Technology Park (Salerno), the "Tecnopolis" science and technology park (Valenzano), the "CALPARK" science and technology park (Rende), the "Magna Graecia" scientific, the technological and multisectoral park (Crotone), the Science and technology park of Sicily (Catania) and the Technology park of Sardinia (Pula).

Personality

Through the centuries, Italy has fostered the scientific community that produced many major discoveries in physics and the other sciences. During the Renaissance Italian polymaths such as Leonardo da Vinci (1452–1519), Michelangelo (1475–1564) and Leon Battista Alberti (1404–1472) made contributions in a variety of fields, including biology, architecture, and engineering. Galileo Galilei (1564–1642), an astronomer, physicist, engineer, and polymath, played a major role in the Scientific Revolution. He is considered the "father" of observational astronomy, modern physics, the scientific method, modern science.

Other astronomers such as Giovanni Domenico Cassini (1625–1712) and Giovanni Schiaparelli (1835–1910) made discoveries about the Solar System. In mathematics, Joseph Louis Lagrange (born Giuseppe Lodovico Lagrangia, 1736–1813) was active before leaving Italy. Fibonacci (c. 1170 – c. 1250), and Gerolamo Cardano (1501–1576) made fundamental advances in mathematics. Luca Pacioli established accounting to the world. Physicist Enrico Fermi (1901–1954), a Nobel prize laureate, led the team in Chicago that developed the first nuclear reactor. He is considered the "architect of the nuclear age" and the "architect of the atomic bomb". He, Emilio G. Segrè (1905–1989) who discovered the elements technetium and astatine, and the antiproton), Bruno Rossi (1905–1993) a pioneer in Cosmic Rays and X-ray astronomy) and a number of Italian physicists were forced to leave Italy in the 1930s by Fascist laws against Jews.

Other prominent physicists include Amedeo Avogadro (most noted for his contributions to molecular theory, in particular the Avogadro's law and the Avogadro constant), Evangelista Torricelli (inventor of barometer), Alessandro Volta (inventor of electric battery), Guglielmo Marconi (inventor of radio), Galileo Ferraris and Antonio Pacinotti, pioneers of the induction motor, Alessandro Cruto, pioneer of light bulb and Innocenzo Manzetti, eclectic pioneer of auto and robotics, Ettore Majorana (who discovered the Majorana fermions), Carlo Rubbia (1984 Nobel Prize in Physics for work leading to the discovery of the W and Z particles at CERN). Antonio Meucci is known for developing a voice-communication device which is often credited as the first telephone. 

Pier Giorgio Perotto in 1964 designed one of the first desktop programmable calculators, the Programma 101. In biology, Francesco Redi has been the first to challenge the theory of spontaneous generation by demonstrating that maggots come from eggs of flies and he described 180 parasites in details and Marcello Malpighi founded microscopic anatomy, Lazzaro Spallanzani conducted research in bodily functions, animal reproduction, and cellular theory, Camillo Golgi, whose many achievements include the discovery of the Golgi complex, paved the way to the acceptance of the Neuron doctrine, Rita Levi-Montalcini discovered the nerve growth factor (awarded 1986 Nobel Prize in Physiology or Medicine). In chemistry, Giulio Natta received the Nobel Prize in Chemistry in 1963 for his work on high polymers. Giuseppe Occhialini received the Wolf Prize in Physics for the discovery of the pion or pi-meson decay in 1947. Ennio de Giorgi, a Wolf Prize in Mathematics recipient in 1990, solved Bernstein's problem about minimal surfaces and the 19th Hilbert problem on the regularity of solutions of Elliptic partial differential equations.

Nobel Prizes

See also

 Internet in Italy
 Telecommunications in Italy
 List of Italian inventions
 Roman technology

References

Further reading
 Cocco, Sean. Watching Vesuvius: A History of Science and Culture in Early Modern Italy (2012)
 Cocco, Sean. "Locating the Natural Sciences in Early Modern Naples," ch 20 in A Companion to Early Modern Naples (2013) pp: 453+.
 Galdabini, Silvana, and Giuseppe Giuliani. "Physics in Italy between 1900 and 1940: The universities, physicists, funds, and research." Historical studies in the physical and biological sciences (1988): 115-136. in JSTOR
 Miele, Aldo, ed. Gli Scienziati Italiani dall'Inizio del Medio Eno ai Nostri Giorni. Vol. 1, Part 1 (Nardecchia, 1921)
 
 Orlando, Lucia. "Physics in the 1930s: Jewish Physicists' Contribution to the Realization of the" New Tasks" of Physics in Italy." Historical studies in the physical and biological sciences (1998): 141-181. in JSTOR
 Pancaldi, Giuliano. "Vito volterra: Cosmopolitan ideals and nationality in the Italian scientific community between the belle époque and the first world war." Minerva (1993) 31#1 pp: 21-37.
 Schmitt, Charles B. Science in the Italian universities in the sixteenth and early seventeenth centuries (Macmillan, 1975)
 Turchetti, Simone. The Pontecorvo Affair: A Cold War Defection and Nuclear Physics (University of Chicago Press, 2012)

External links
 SCI-BYTES - WHAT'S NEW IN RESEARCH: 2008, Science in Italy, 2003-07. sciencewatch.com. Web. 29 Sep. 2011.